Uzhursky District is an administrative and municipal district (raion), one of the forty-three in Krasnoyarsk Krai, Russia. It is located in the southwest of the krai and borders with Nazarovsky District in the north, Balakhtinsky District in the east, Novosyolovsky District in the southeast, the Republic of Khakassia in the south, and with Sharypovsky District in the west and northwest. Its administrative center is the town of Uzhur. Population:  36,169 (2002 Census);  The population of Uzhur accounts for 47.7% of the district's total population.

History
The district was founded on April 4, 1924.

Government
As of 2013, the Head of the District and the Chairman of the District Council is Gazilya N. Kuznetsova.

References

Notes

Sources

Districts of Krasnoyarsk Krai
States and territories established in 1924